Bandarlapalle is a village in Ramakuppam mandal, located in Chittoor district of the Indian state of Andhra Pradesh.

population
population   (2011) - Total.  6,034 -  males. 3,087 -females.  2,947 - no. of houses. 1,294

References 

Villages in Chittoor district